The ECO Trade and Development Bank (ETDB) is a regional multilateral development bank established under the auspices of the ECO Economic Cooperation Organization to promote socio-economic development and intra-regional trade amongst ECO member states.

The ETDB was established in 2005 with its headquarters located in Istanbul. The bank started its operations in 2008. The representative offices of the bank in Tehran and Karachi are functional.

The primary objective of the bank is to provide financial resources for investment projects and development programmes in member countries.

References

International banking institutions
Organizations established in 2005
Organizations based in Istanbul
2005 establishments in Turkey
Turkish companies established in 2005
Banks established in 2005
International organizations based in Turkey